Mallorca, Op 202 or Majorca is a composition by Isaac Albéniz. Since it has been transcribed for classical guitar it has become an important work for the classical guitar repertoire. It has been played and recorded by guitarists such as Julian Bream and John Williams and many others. It is generally played in the key of D minor.
John Williams once said "I'd like to play Mallorca, a piece depicting a mysterious, beautiful island with a Moorish influence."

References

Compositions by Isaac Albéniz
Spanish compositions for solo piano
Compositions for guitar